The Roxbury School District is a community public school district that serves students in kindergarten through twelfth grade in Roxbury Township, in Morris County, New Jersey, United States.

As of the 2018–19 school year, the district, comprising seven schools, had an enrollment of 3,551 students and 328.1 classroom teachers (on an FTE basis), for a student–teacher ratio of 10.8:1.

The district's high school also serves students from Mount Arlington, who attend as part of a sending/receiving relationship.

The district is classified by the New Jersey Department of Education as being in District Factor Group "GH", the third-highest of eight groupings. District Factor Groups organize districts statewide to allow comparison by common socioeconomic characteristics of the local districts. From lowest socioeconomic status to highest, the categories are A, B, CD, DE, FG, GH, I and J.

Schools 
Schools in the district consists of the following (with 2018–19 enrollment data from the National Center for Education Statistics) are:
Elementary schools
Franklin Elementary School with 332 students in grades K-4
Lisa Ferrare, Principal
Jefferson Elementary School with 369 students in grades K-4
Melissa Cosgrove, Principal
Kennedy Elementary School with 254 students in grades K-4
Nicole Acevedo, Principal
Nixon Elementary School with 258 students in grades K-4
Danielle Lynch, Principal
Middle schools
Lincoln / Roosevelt School with 480 students in grades 5-6
Christopher Argenziano, Principal
Eisenhower Middle School with 534 students in grades 7-8
Paul Gallagher, Principal
High school
Roxbury High School with 1,297 students in grades 9-12
Dominick Miller, Principal

Administration
Core members of the district's administration are:
Loretta Radulic, Superintendent
Joseph Mondanaro, Business Administrator / Board Secretary

Board of education
The district's board of education, with nine members, sets policy and oversees the fiscal and educational operation of the district through its administration. As a Type II school district, the board's trustees are elected directly by voters to serve three-year terms of office on a staggered basis, with three seats up for election each year held (since 2012) as part of the November general election. The board appoints a superintendent to oversee the day-to-day operation of the district. The Mount Arlington district appoints a tenth trustee to represent its interests on the Roxbury board.

School policies
The Roxbury School District Board of Education requires that all students stand while the Pledge of Allegiance is being recited with their right hand over their heart.

Controversies

Discipline of board member
In April 2011, an administrative law judge ruled that the Roxbury Board of Education acted outside of its authority when it censured Maureen Castriotta, a school board member. Castriotta had differed with other school board members about spending priorities and had protested against a student protest organized by Superintendent Michael Rossi and High School Principal Jeffrey Swanson against funding cuts proposed by Governor Chris Christie. The ALJ vacated the censure, as the matter should have been decided by the School Ethics Commission, rather than by a school board that denied Castriotta's due process. At a June 2010 town hall meeting, Christie supported Castriotta's right to "speak up," and he asked the audience if school administrators would have allowed a student rally that was against the New Jersey Education Association, the state's largest teacher's union.

Employee theft
In April 2015, the lead mechanic for the Roxbury school district's transportation department was charged with stealing about 1,900 gallons of fuel from the district. The mechanic was ordered to pay back the school district the $8,000 value of the fuel and required to give up his right to public employment in the state.

References

External links 
Roxbury School District

Roxbury School District, National Center for Education Statistics
Bullying in Roxbury School District
Roxbury Taxpayers Education Association Members

Roxbury Township, New Jersey
New Jersey District Factor Group GH
School districts in Morris County, New Jersey